Alex Negrea (born 1 October 1998)  is a Romanian professional footballer who plays as a left back for Liga III club CSM Satu Mare, on loan from FC Hermannstadt.

Club career

Early career
Negrea started his career in the academy of Augsburg.Over time he was promoted in the under-17 team in 2014, in the under-19 team in 2015 where he played 25 matches and gave 1 assist and in 2017, he was promoted in the reserve team where he managed to make 8 appearances before leaving the club in 2019.

Chindia Târgoviște
On 22 November 2019, Negrea joined his natal country team Chindia Târgoviște in the Liga I..He had only managed to make only 7 appearances in the two seasons he spent with Chindia Târgoviște in Liga I.

Sportul Șimleu
On 22 July 2021, Negrea joined Liga III club Sportul Șimleu.

Hermannstadt
On 4 February 2022, Negrea signed for Liga II club Hermannstadt on a free transfer.

Satu Mare
In the summer of 2022, Negrea joined Liga III club Satu Mare.

References

External links
 
 Alex Negrea at lpf.ro

Romanian footballers
Romania youth international footballers
Romanian expatriate sportspeople in Germany
Liga I players
Liga II players
Liga III players
AFC Chindia Târgoviște players
FC Hermannstadt players
1998 births
Living people
Sportspeople from Satu Mare
Association football defenders
Association football midfielders
Expatriate footballers in Germany